Hydnocarpus venenatus is a species of plant in the Achariaceae family. It is endemic to Sri Lanka. It is threatened by habitat loss. This species has been included as a Mozambican species on the basis of its presence in the Preliminary Mozambican checklist. However there is no species of this name in the Sub-Saharan checklist.

In culture
Hydnocarpus venenatus is known as " මකුලු ගහ (Makulu gaha)" or "මකුල (Makula)" in Sinhala.

venenata
Endemic flora of Sri Lanka